Clarke Rosenberg (born April 13, 1993) is an American-Israeli basketball player who currently plays for Ironi Nahariya of the Israeli Basketball National League and the Balkan League. He  plays the guard position.

Personal life
Rosenberg was born in Evanston, Illinois, and raised in Skokie, Illinois. He is the son of Jason and Sheila Rosenberg. His father Jason was born to Jewish parents, including Clarke's paternal grandmother, Irma Rosenberg. Clarke became a dual American-Israeli citizen in 2015.

Basketball career
At Evanston Township High School ('11), playing for the Wildkits, Rosenberg averaged 15 points, six rebounds, four assists, and three steals a game in his final season.

He then attended Chicago State University, where Rosenberg played for the Cougars and was the class of 2015. He was known as a playmaker and for a smooth shot. In his sophomore year in 2012-13, he led the Great West Conference in games (33) and was 8th in steals (36).  In his junior year in 2013-14 he ranked sixth in the Western Athletic Conference in steals per game (1.4), eighth in free throw percentage (.750), and averaged 14 points per game. In his senior year in 2014-15 he averaged 15 points per game, and was 8th in the WAC in steals per game (1.2) and 10th in free throw percentage (.672).

Rosenberg played for Hapoel Be'er Sheva in the Israeli Basketball Premier League in 2020.

References

External links
Chicago State Cougars bio

1993 births
Living people
American expatriate basketball people in Israel
American men's basketball players
Basketball players from Illinois
Chicago State Cougars men's basketball players
Guards (basketball)
Hapoel Be'er Sheva B.C. players
Israeli Basketball Premier League players
Israeli men's basketball players
Jewish American sportspeople
Jewish men's basketball players
Sportspeople from Evanston, Illinois
Israeli American
21st-century American Jews